Anastasios "Tasos" Spyropoulos (born April 1, 1995) is a Greek professional basketball player for Mykonos of the Greek 3rd division. He is a 2.08 m (6'10") tall power forward-center.

Professional career
Spyropoulos began his professional career on March 9, 2011, during the 2010–11 season, with the Greek Basket League club PAOK. He joined the first division Greek club Panionios in 2012, where he spent three seasons. He then played for Greek 2nd division club Doukas, in the 2015–16 season. He moved to the Greek 2nd division club Gymnastikos Larissas, for the 2016–17 season. He joined the Greek 2nd Division club Holargos, for the 2017–18 season. 

From 2018 to 2022, Spyropoulos played for Larisa (formerly known as Ermis Agias). During the 2021-2022 campaign, in 16 league games, he averaged 1.4 points and 1.3 rebounds, playing around 6 minutes per contest. In July 2022, Spyropoulos moved to Mykonos and signed with the local club, following his former coach Giannis Tzimas.

National team career
With the junior national teams of Greece, Spyropoulos played at the 2011 FIBA Europe Under-16 Championship, the 2013 FIBA Europe Under-18 Championship, and the 2015 FIBA Europe Under-20 Championship.

References

External links
EuroCup Profile
FIBA Archive Profile
FIBA Europe Profile
Eurobasket.com Profile
Greek Basket League Profile 
Greek Basket League Profile 

1995 births
Living people
Centers (basketball)
Doukas B.C. players
Larisa B.C. players
Greek men's basketball players
Gymnastikos S. Larissas B.C. players
Holargos B.C. players
Panionios B.C. players
P.A.O.K. BC players
Power forwards (basketball)
Basketball players from Larissa